Åke Valter Stenqvist (31 January 1914 – 12 August 2006) was a Swedish athlete who specialized in the 100 m sprint and long jump. He competed in the 4 × 100 m relay and long jump at the 1936 Summer Olympics and finished 10th in the long jump. Later he won a silver medal in the relay at the 1938 European Championships.

Stenqvist held national titles in the long jump (1935–42) and pentathlon (1940–42); he was also an international handball player.

References

External links
 
 
 
 
 

1914 births
2006 deaths
Swedish male sprinters
Swedish male handball players
Swedish male long jumpers
Olympic athletes of Sweden
Athletes (track and field) at the 1936 Summer Olympics
European Athletics Championships medalists
Athletes from Stockholm